The 1999 Asian Weightlifting Championships were held in Wuhan, China between August 29 and September 5, 1999. It was the 31st men's and 12th women's championship. The event was organised by the Asian Weightlifting Federation.

Medal summary

Men

Women

Medal table 

Ranking by Big (Total result) medals 

Ranking by all medals: Big (Total result) and Small (Snatch and Clean & Jerk)

Participating nations 
71 athletes from 9 nations competed.

 (15)
 (12)
 (12)
 (8)
 (6)
 (4)
 (1)
 (9)
 (4)

References
Results

Asian Weightlifting Championships
Asian Weightlifting Championships
Weightlifting Championships
Asian Weightlifting Championships